Weightlifting is one of the sports contested at the 2022 Pacific Mini Games, to be held in Saipan, Northern Mariana Islands. The competition is scheduled to take place between 20 and 23 June 2022, spread across twenty weight classes (ten per gender).

The event was also designated the 2022 Oceania Senior Weightlifting Championships.

Competition schedule
The competition schedule is as follows:

Participating nations
As of 1 June 2022, fifteen countries and territories have confirmed their participation in the games.

Medal summary

Medal table
Medals are awarded for the Snatch, the Clean & Jerk, and the Total in accordance with the Pacific Games Councils Charter; Protocol 26. Four or more contestants: Gold Silver and Bronze; three contestants: Gold and Silver only; two contestants: Gold only; one contestant: no event, no medal.

Men's results

Women's results

Medal table (Oceania Championships)
Medals were awarded for totals only and were not contingent on minimum participation limits.

Medal summary (Oceania Championships)

Men

Women

See also
Weightlifting at the Pacific Games

References

External links
Results book

2022 Pacific Mini Games
Pacific Mini Games
2022